Sérgio Pinheiro (born 11 June 1944) is a Brazilian volleyball player. He competed in the men's tournament at the 1968 Summer Olympics.

References

1944 births
Living people
Brazilian men's volleyball players
Olympic volleyball players of Brazil
Volleyball players at the 1968 Summer Olympics
Volleyball players from Rio de Janeiro (city)